Stellaria obtusa is a species of flowering plant in the family Caryophyllaceae known by the common names Rocky Mountain chickweed, blunt-sepaled starwort, and obtuse starwort. It is native to western North America, from British Columbia and Alberta to California to Colorado, where it grows in moist areas in forests and on mountain slopes.

It is a rhizomatous perennial herb producing a prostrate, creeping, branching stem up to about 20 centimeters long, sometimes forming mats. The oval leaves are up to about a centimeter long and are borne in opposite pairs on the stem. Solitary flowers occur in the leaf axils, each borne on a short pedicel. The small flower has no petals, just four to five blunt-tipped green sepals each a few millimeters long.

References

External links
Jepson Manual Treatment
Flora of North America
Photo gallery

obtusa
Flora of the Western United States
Flora of the Sierra Nevada (United States)
Flora of the Rocky Mountains
Plants described in 1882
Flora of Western Canada
Flora of the Northwestern United States
Flora of the Southwestern United States
Flora without expected TNC conservation status